Ma Ma can refer to:

 Ma-ma (1976 film), a 1976 Romanian film
 Ma Ma (2015 film), a 2015 Spanish film

See also
 Mama